Wedelia calendulacea may refer to:

Wedelia calendulacea (L.) Less., an illegitimate name that is a synonym of Sphagneticola calendulacea
Wedelia calendulacea Rich, an unresolved name in the genus Wedelia

References